Swartz Creek is a tributary of the Flint River.

Swartz Creek may also refer to:
Swartz Creek, Michigan, a city in Genesee County, Michigan

See also
Swartz Creek Community Schools, a public school district in Genesee County, Michigan
West Second Street–Swartz Creek Bridge
Swartz (disambiguation)
Schwartz (disambiguation)